= The Energy Check Stadium =

The Energy Check Stadium is the sponsored name of two British football stadiums:

- The Energy Check Stadium at Gigg Lane, home of Bury F.C.
- The Energy Check County Ground, home of Swindon Town F.C
